Brothers3 are an Australian country music band from Mudgee, New South Wales. The band consists of brothers Makirum, Shardyn and Tayzin Fahey-Leigh. In 2014, Brothers3 placed third on the sixth season of The X Factor Australia.

Early life
Brothers3 is made up of siblings Makirum, Shardyn and Tayzin Fahey-Leigh. Their mother Alita Fahey is also a singer, as well as a former actress and television reporter. The band's father Stephen died from a heart attack on 25 December 2006. Brothers3 also have two other siblings. They grew up on a farm in Mudgee, New South Wales surrounded by music because their farm had no regular electricity, television or running water. The brothers were home schooled through distance education.

Career

2009–14: Formation and music releases
Brothers3 were formed as a present for their mother's 50th birthday. Their debut single "Road to Cargalgong" was released as a double A-side with the song "Where the Eagles Fly" on 30 November 2009. Brothers3's debut studio album, also titled Where the Eagles Fly, was released on 31 March 2010 by independent record label Hardrush Music. The album features 10 original songs that the band co-wrote on their farm in the New South Wales Central Western Slopes. Their second single "Christmas in Australia" was released as a double A-side with "A Christmas Song" in December 2010. "Lyrebird on the Roof" was independently released on 1 January 2011 as the lead single from Brothers3's second studio album Wattle Fire. The album was independently released on 29 January 2011.

The band's fourth single "Kelsey's Song" was independently released on 4 February 2011. It was later included on Brothers3's third studio album Australia, which was independently released on 1 December 2011. Their fourth studio album, Let It Drift, was independently released on 31 January 2013. Travelling and Favourites were released as Brothers3's fifth and sixth studio albums on 17 January 2014. The former features original songs, while the latter album includes a mix of original songs and covers. Brothers3's cover version of Leonard Cohen's "Hallelujah" was released as a single from Favourites on 1 September 2014.

2014: The X Factor Australia
In 2014, Brothers3 successfully auditioned for the sixth season of The X Factor Australia, singing "Safe & Sound" by Taylor Swift. They received four yeses from the judges and progressed to the super bootcamp round of the competition. For the first bootcamp challenge, Brothers3 were paired up with another group from the Groups category to perform a song together for the judges. Brothers3 made it to the second bootcamp challenge, where they performed "Story of My Life" by One Direction to the judges and a live audience of one thousand. Brothers3 then progressed to the home visits round in Sydney and performed "Eternal Flame by The Bangles in front of their mentor Dannii Minogue and guest mentors Jessica Mauboy and James Blunt. They were originally eliminated by Minogue during home visits, but were later put forward as her wildcard and won the public vote, ensuring a place in the live finals—a series of eleven weekly live shows in which contestants are progressively eliminated by public vote. After the eliminations of Trill, Younger Than Yesterday and XOX during the first four weeks of the live shows, Brothers3 became the last remaining act in Minogue's category despite being just her wildcard. During the grand final decider show on 20 October 2014, it was announced that Brothers3 finished in third place behind runner-up Dean Ray and winner Marlisa Punzalan.

Performances on The X Factor

 denotes a performance that entered the ARIA Singles Chart. denotes third place.

2014–present: Brothers Never Part
On 24 October 2014, it was announced that Brothers3 had received a recording contract with Sony Music Australia. Their sixth overall single "The Lucky Ones", which would have been their winner's single if they had won The X Factor, was released on the iTunes Store that same day. It debuted at number 29 on the ARIA Singles Chart. Following the single's release, Brothers3 were dropped by Sony Music and signed with Warner Music Australia in 2015. The group's seventh single "Brothers Never Part" was released on 11 September 2015. Their seventh studio album of the same name will be released on 15 January 2016, and marks their first major label album release.

Artistry
Brothers3 perform traditional country, folk and bluegrass music. Aside from singing, they write their own songs "about real stories, animals and the countryside". The band can also play the banjo, bass, clarinet, guitar, harmonica, keyboard, mandolin, and trumpet. Brothers3 cite Darren Cogan, John Williamson, Johnny Cash, Keith Urban, Miley Cyrus, Reg Poole, The Robertson Brothers, Slim Newton and Taylor Swift as their musical inspirations.

Members

Shardyn Fahey-Leigh
Shardyn Fahey-Leigh, born , is the eldest brother in the band. He cites Earl Scruggs, John Denver and Keith Urban as his musical influences. Aside from music, Shardyn has also pursued a career in acting and musical theatre. In 2002, he made a guest appearance in the season four episode "A Prefect Murder" of the Australian/American sci-fi television series Farscape. In 2006, Shardyn appeared alongside Hugh Jackman in the arena tour of The Boy from Oz, playing the role of a young Peter Allen. In 2008, Shardyn played the role of Wil in John Williamson's bush musical Quambatook. That same year, he made a guest appearance in the Australian soap opera Home and Away as Jamie Cooper, the son of Julie Cooper. The following year, he appeared in the season one episode "Bertie 1918" of the Australian children's television series My Place, playing the role of young magician Bertie. Shardyn left school early to attend university. Prior to entering The X Factor, he studied at the Australian Academy of Music and Performing Arts.

Tayzin Fahey-Leigh
Tayzin Fahey-Leigh, born , is the second-eldest brother. He cites country music and Queen as his influences. Aside from music, Tayzin has also pursued a career in acting. In 2002, he made a guest appearance in the season five episode "Bedtime Stories" of the Australian medical drama television series All Saints, playing the role of Brian Richards. In 2005, Tayzin appeared in the films Son of the Mask and Hell Has Harbour Views. In June 2011, he played the teenage Chad Morgan in the documentary film I'm Not Dead Yet. Tayzin left school early to attend university. Prior to entering The X Factor, he studied at JMC Academy in Sydney.

Makirum Fahey-Leigh
Makirum Fahey-Leigh, born , is the youngest brother. He cites Guthrie Govan as his musical influence. Aside from music, Makirum has also pursued a career in acting and musical theatre. In 2008, he played the role of Pete in John Williamson's bush musical Quambatook. Makirum also appeared in the films Happy Feet (2006) and The Black Balloon (2008). In September 2011, he made a guest appearance in the twelfth episode of the Australian television drama series Crownies, playing the role of Brett O'Leary. Makirum left school early to attend university. Prior to entering The X Factor, he studied at the Australian Academy of Music and Performing Arts.

Discography

Studio albums

Singles

Other charted songs

Music videos

Awards and nominations

Country Music Awards of Australia
The Country Music Awards of Australia is an annual awards night held in January during the Tamworth Country Music Festival. Celebrating recording excellence in the Australian country music industry. They commenced in 1973.
 

! 
|-
|rowspan="1"| 2016 || Brothers 3 || New Talent of the Year ||  || 
|}

References

Sibling musical trios
Australian boy bands
Australian country music groups
Australian musical trios
New South Wales musical groups
Musical groups established in 2009
The X Factor (Australian TV series) contestants
People educated at Sydney Distance Education High School